Muhammad Sakizli (1892–14 January 1976) was the Prime Minister of Cyrenaica from 18 March 1950 to 24 December 1951. He was later appointed as the Prime Minister of Libya from 19 February to 12 April 1954.

Personal life 
Sakizli was of Turkish descent. His surname known in Ottoman Turkish as Sakız hence his epithet "Sakızlı".

Government of Cyrenaica
On 1 June 1949, emir Idris declared the "independence" of the Emirate of Cyrenaica. Although this independence could be considered nominal because of the high British influence, forming a new government was necessary. After a short-lived government under Omar Pasha El Kikhia, Muhammad  Sakizli formed a new cabinet in March 1950. After King Idris I of Libya declared its independence 24 December 1951, Sakizli's title changed to be "Governor" of Cyrenaica and remained in that post until May 1952.
In May 1952, Sakizli was appointed minister of education in the Libyan federal government. Then, In September 1953, he was appointed the chief of the royal bureau.

Prime minister
In February 1954, Sakizli was assigned to form a government., but his cabinet didn't persist for long. On 5 April 1954, The Libyan supreme court issued the decision that the royal order, issued on 19 January 1954, ordering the legislative council of Tripolitania to be dissolved, is cancelled. Consequently, protests erupted in Tripoli, organized by Tripolitania's governor As-Siddig al-Mutassir, against the court's decision which cancelled the King Idris's order.

On 7 April, the cabinet was summoned, while the Tripoli protests was going on, and governor al-Mutassir is continuing to run the legislative elections, which means actually the defying of the court's decision. Consequently, Sakizli telephoned King Idris to order governor al-Mutassir to stop the elections, which, apparently, the King doesn't agree with.

The next day, a royal message was delivered to Sakizli demanding his resignation.

After the Premiership
Sakizli became the governor of Cyernaica again from 26 December 1962, to 26 April 1963, when the federal system in Libya was cancelled.

Sakizli died on 14 January 1976.

Notes

References
Mustafa Ben Halim, "Safahat Matwiya men Tarikh Libia as Siyasi", Matabe' al-Ahram at Tejariya, Qalyub, Misr, 1992.
Mohamed Yousef el-Magariaf, "Libia bain al Madi wal Hadir: Safahat men at Tarikh as Siyasi", 4 vols., Markaz ad Dirasat al Libiya, Oxford, & Maktabat Wahba 14 al-Gomhuriya street Cairo, 2004–2006.
Salem el Kebti, "Libia..Maseerat al Istiqlal..Watha'iq Mahalliya wa Dawliya", part 3-Takween Dawla, Ad Dar al Arabiya lil Ulum Nashiroun, 1st ed., 2012.

Prime Ministers of Libya
1892 births
1976 deaths
Foreign ministers of Libya
Government ministers of Libya
Education ministers of Libya
Libyan people of Turkish descent